Tilde Maria Henny Märta Fröling (born 15 May 1980), the daughter of the Swedish actors Ewa Fröling and Örjan Ramberg, is a Swedish actress, TV presenter and model.

She was the winning participant in the 2005 TV3 celebrity version of Expedition Robinson. Currently Fröling can be seen on Swedish television channels TV6 and TV3, on the TV shows Rocky & Drago with Peter Siepen, and Lustgården respectively. She has figured in a television advertisement with Pontus Gårdinger for the Swedish lager Norrlands Guld, manufactured by Spendrups.

Fröling was a contestant on the television show Let's Dance 2008.

Filmography
 Robinson VIP (2005)
 c/o Segemyhr (2003)
 Strawberries with Real Milk (2001)
 Sprängaren (2001) (English title: Deadline)

External links

1980 births
Living people
Swedish actresses
Swedish female models
Swedish television personalities
Swedish women television presenters